Senator Holden may refer to:

Edgar Holden (1914–2001), Iowa State Senate
Kip Holden (born 1952), Louisiana State Senate
Nate Holden (born 1929), California State Senate
William Holden (politician) (died 1884), California State Senate